Ten Cents a Dance is a 1931 American pre-Code romance-drama film directed by Lionel Barrymore and starring Barbara Stanwyck as a married taxi dancer who falls in love with one of her customers. The film was inspired by the popular song of the same name, which is sung over the title sequence. The film was also made in a Spanish language version, titled, Carne de Cabaret, directed by Christy Cabanne.

Plot
A beautiful streetwise taxi dancer named Barbara O'Neill works at a New York City dance hall called Palais de Dance. One of the dance hall's wealthy patrons, Bradley Carlton, comes to the hall and gives Barbara $100. Concerned about her unemployed friend and neighbor Eddie Miller, Barbara asks Bradley to give him a job, and he agrees. That night they have dinner together.

When Barbara gets home, Eddie is in the process of packing his bags; he can no longer afford to pay his rent. Barbara gives him the $100 she received from Bradley and tells him about his new job. Later, Eddie and Barbara meet in the park and realize that they are in love. The next night at the dance hall, Barbara receives a gift of a new dress, but is disappointed when she sees that it was sent by Bradley. Eddie arrives at the dance hall and asks Barbara to marry him. Barbara accepts his proposal and soon quits her job.

Five months later, Eddie meets an old friend Ralph Clark and his sister Nancy, and does not reveal that he is now married. They play cards together and Eddie loses $240, something he hides from Barbara. He claims to be at a convention, but in fact he meets a woman, Nancy. Later, Eddie returns to find the rent and utilities past due because he has spent his pay gambling. Meanwhile, Barbara returns to work at the dance hall, where she sees Bradley occasionally.

Later, Barbara returns home and discovers Eddie packing his bags. Admitting that he stole $5,000 from Bradley's office safe, he tells her that he lost that money playing the stock market. Barbara is able to talk him into staying, and she visits Bradley and asks him for a $5,000 loan. Bradley agrees because he is in love with her. The next morning, Barbara presents the money to Eddie who accepts it immediately. When Eddie returns from work, he and Barbara engage in a jealous fight. Soon after, she packs her belongings and returns to the dance hall, where she is met by Bradley who has two tickets for the Ile de France, where Barbara can obtain a divorce and marry him.

Cast
 Barbara Stanwyck as Barbara O'Neill
 Ricardo Cortez as Bradley Carlton
 Monroe Owsley as Eddie Miller
 Sally Blane as Molly
 Blanche Friderici as Mrs Blanchard
 Martha Sleeper as Nancy Clark
 David Newell as Ralph Sheridan
 Victor Potel as Smith
 Sidney Bracey as Wilson
 Abe Lyman and His Orchestra
 Aggie Herring as Mrs Carney
 Harry Todd as Mr Carney
 Phyllis Crane as Eunice
 Olive Tell as Mrs Carlton
 Al Hill as Jones
 Pat Harmon as Casey

(Cast list as per AFI's database)

Production
The film was also shot in a Spanish language version, directed by Christy Cabanne. The Spanish version stars Lupita Tovar, Ramón Pereda, and René Cardona.

References

External links
 
 
 

1931 films
1931 romantic drama films
American romantic drama films
American black-and-white films
Columbia Pictures films
Films based on songs
Films directed by Lionel Barrymore
Films set in New York City
Films with screenplays by Jo Swerling
1930s English-language films
1930s American films